There were about 100 contributors to Rees's Cyclopædia, most of whom were Nonconformists. They were specialists in their fields, covering science, technology, medicine, manufacturing, agriculture, banking and transportation, as well as the arts and humanities. A number were members of the teaching staffs of the Royal Military Academy, and the Addiscombe Military Seminary of the East India Company. Other contributors were working journalists who wrote for scientific, medical and technical periodicals of the time. Several of the contributors were active in radical politics; one was gaoled for sedition and another indicted for treason.

Amongst the eminent writers engaged by Rees were Dr Charles Burney (1726–1814) who wrote on music and musical biography; Dr Lant Carpenter (1780–1870) on education, mental and moral philosophy; Tiberius Cavallo (1799–1809) on electricity and magnetism; John Farey, sr. (1766–1826), on canals, geology, music and surveying; John Farey, jr. (1791–1851) on machinery, manufactures, steam engine, and water. He also contributed a great number of the illustrations; John Flaxman (1755–1826) on sculpture; Luke Howard (1772–1867) on meteorology; John Landseer (1769–1852) on engraving; Sir William Lawrence, (1783–1867) on human and comparative anatomy; Sir James Edward Smith (1759–1828) on botany; David Mushet on metallurgy and chemistry; Rev. William Pearson (1767–1847) on astronomy; Sir Thomas Phillips (1770–1875) on painting.

Among the artists and engravers employed were Aaron Arrowsmith (1750–1823) who engraved the maps; William Blake (1757–1827) who made engravings to illustrate some of the sculpture articles; Thomas Milton (1743–1827) who engraved most of the natural history plates; Wilson Lowry (1762–1824) who engraved numerous of the plates especially those relating to architecture, machinery and scientific instruments.

With the exception of the botanical articles by Sir James Edward Smith, none of the articles are signed. Names were recorded in the Prospectus of 1802, the introduction at the start of the first volume, the paper covers of the unbound parts which have survived, and in a paper in the Philosophical Magazine, published in 1820. The following alphabetical list has been compiled from the foregoing sources. The majority appear in the Dictionary of National Biography, and in sources listed in the British Biographical Index, but these accounts rarely record an involvement with the Cyclopædia.

List of contributors

List of contributors by topic
The previous list has been sorted into subject areas. It allows contributors of many single articles, usually of monograph length, to be identified. However a number of subjects, such as architecture and chemistry, have multiple contributors, so individual attributions are not possible.

The following are noted as contributors of unidentified topics:
Abraham Rees, Charles Rochmont Aikin, Edward Coleman, Henry Ellis, Henry Howard, Jeremiah Joyce, John Clennel,	Sir Astley Cooper, W. Crowe, (?Thomas) Clarkson, Richard Pearson, Thomas Rees, W. Symonds, and William Thomas.

List of artists
Artists not listed as contributors:

List of engravers
Engravers not listed as contributors:

Pseudonymous and unknown contributors
Pseudonymous and unknown contributors are very few. Contributor Richard Watson Dickson published a book about gardening in 1807 under the name of Alexander MacDonald. At about this time there seems to have been a genre established of books on practical topics for craftsmen, containing information taken from the various encyclopædias being published then and written by journalists. One such was "Thomas Martin", The Circle of the Mechanical Arts. Another was "John Nicholson", The Operative Mechanic, 1825. Both the writers were described as civil engineers, yet are quite unknown in the profession and published nothing more.

A handful of contributors are just recorded by name, with no indication of what they contributed, nor whom they might be.

George Glover
George Glover (fl. 1804–18), naval architect, was the named author of the naval architecture articles. However, no person of that name has been traced writing anything else or to have a connection with shipbuilding matters. It seems probable that the name is pseudonymous.

The articles are:
Blocks, vol 4, 1804/5
Boat, vol 4, 1804/5
Mast, vol 22, 1812
Rope and Rope-making, vol 30, 1815
Rigging, vol 30, 1815
Sail and Sail-Making, vol 31, 1815
Ship-Building, vol 32, 1816
Yards, vol 39, 1818

These articles were reprinted (with the one by John Farey on the manufacture of Ship's Blocks, from Volume 22), by David & Charles in 1972 with the title Rees's Naval Architecture. All the Glover articles have elements from the 1794 edition of Steel's Rigging and Seamanship and the 1818 edition of The Art of Rigging.

John Fletcher
A number of the covers (1805–1809) note he was a lecturer at the Royal Institution; he also wrote about chemistry. So far, no biographical information has been found.

Kirkman
Noted as making drawings, but no candidate has been found.

H. Parker
Noted as writing about prosody and versification, but no candidate has been found.

George Sanderson
Noted as writing the "Arch" article, but no candidate has been found. He was a self-taught mathematician. A portrait had appeared in Philosophical Magazine, vol. 15, with an appeal for a biography to be written.

W. Symonds
No topics or candidate have been found.

Notes and references

British encyclopedists
Rees's Cyclopædia